Dorozhny is a rural locality (a settlement) in Prilukskoye Rural Settlement, Vologodsky District, Vologda Oblast, Russia. The population was 601 as of 2002.

Geography 
Dorozhny is located 11 km northeast of Vologda (the district's administrative centre) by road. Grishino is the nearest rural locality.

References 

Rural localities in Vologodsky District